Mahmoud el-Sisi (born 1982) is the deputy head of the Egyptian General Intelligence Directorate and the son of Egyptian President Abdel Fattah el-Sisi.

Biography
Mahmoud is the oldest son of President Abdel Fattah El-Sisi and his wife Entissar Amer, who were cousins. He is a graduate of the Egyptian Military Academy. He was a major in the Military Intelligence, then in June 2018 he rose to the rank of brigadier general, and was appointed deputy head of General Intelligence, after he was head of the agency's technical office, under the leadership of Major General Abbas Kamel.

L'Espresso linked Egyptian President Abdel Fattah el-Sisi's son Mahmoud el-Sisi to the murder of Giulio Regeni, stating that "It is hard to think that el-Sisi's son was not aware of Regeni's movements before he disappeared."

On 20 November 2019, two GIS officials interviewed by Mada Masr stated that Mahmoud was to be shifted from GIS to the Military Intelligence agency and assigned to a diplomatic position in Moscow in 2020. The reason cited for the move and attributed to people close to president el-Sisi was a "negative impact on [president el-Sisi's] image" resulting from Mahmoud's alleged ineffectiveness in his responsibilities and visible role in high-level decision-making. The reason attributed to senior United Arab Emirates government officials is that they saw Mahmoud's role as "damaging to the president". Regional and international media attention to Mahmoud's role was cited as significantly harming president el-Sisi's image and threatening the "stability of the administration". The proposed move was "welcomed" by Russian authorities. In response to Mada Masr's report, Mada Masr journalist Shady Zalat was detained by Egyptian security services for a day and a half; 18 Mada Masr staff, freelancers and foreign journalists were detained incommunicado inside the journal's office for several hours on 24 November; three were briefly detained; and laptops and telephones were confiscated. Chief Editor Lina Attalah described the preparation of the report as having had "every single detail [confirmed] by at least two separate sources — and when it came to some details, as many as four".

Personal life
He is married to Noha Al-Tohami, the daughter of Farid Al-Tohamy, the former head of the General Intelligence and Administrative Control Authority.

References

1982 births
Living people
Military personnel from Cairo
El-Sisi family
Children of presidents of Egypt
Sons of national leaders
Egyptian Military Academy alumni
21st-century Egyptian military personnel